When a person (traditionally the wife in many cultures) assumes the family name of their spouse, in some countries that name replaces the person's previous surname, which in the case of the wife is called the maiden name ("birth name" is also used as a gender-neutral or masculine substitute for maiden name), whereas a married name is a family name or surname adopted by a person upon marriage.

In some jurisdictions, changing names requires a legal process.  When people marry or divorce, the legal aspects of changing names may be simplified or included, so that the new name is established as part of the legal process of marrying or divorcing.  Traditionally, in the Anglophone West, women are far more likely to change their surnames upon marriage than men, but in some instances men may change their last names upon marriage as well, including same-sex couples.

In this article, birth name, family name, surname, married name and maiden name refer to patrilineal surnames unless explicitly described as referring to matrilineal surnames.

English-speaking world
Due to the widespread practice of women changing their names at marriage, they usually encounter little difficulty doing so, as the opportunity is included in the legal process of marrying.

Unless the statutes where the marriage occurred specify that a name change may occur at marriage (in which case the marriage certificate indicates the new name), the courts have officially recognized that such a change is a result of the common law right of a person (man, woman, and sometimes child) to change their name.

There were some early cases in the United States that held that under common law, a woman was required to take her husband's name, but newer cases overturned that (see "Retain the birth name" below). Currently, American women do not have to change their names by law. Lindon v. First National Bank, 10 F. 894 (W.D. Pa. 1882), is one of the very earliest precedent-setting US federal court cases involving common law name change. A woman who had changed her last name to one that was not her husband's original surname was trying to claim control over her inheritance. The court ruled in her favor. This set forth many things. By common law, one may lawfully change their name and be "known and recognized" by that new name. Also, one may enter into any kinds of contracts in their new adopted name. Contracts include employment (see Coppage v. Kansas 236 U.S. 1), and one can be recognized legally in court in their new name. In 1967 in Erie Exchange v. Lane, 246 Md. 55 (1967) the Maryland Court of Appeals held that a married woman can lawfully adopt an assumed name, even if it is not her birth name or the name of her lawful husband, without legal proceedings.

However, men encounter more difficulties in changing their last names. In the United States, only eight states provide for an official name change for a man as part of their marriage process, and in others a man may petition a court or—where not prohibited—change his name without a legal procedure (though government agencies sometimes do not recognize this procedure).

Common options

Use husband's family name
In the past, a woman in England usually assumed her new husband's family name (or surname) after marriage; often she was compelled to do so under coverture laws. Assuming the husband's surname remains common practice today in the United Kingdom (although there is no law that states the name must be changed) and in other countries such as Australia, New Zealand, Pakistan, Gibraltar, Falkland Islands, India, Philippines, the English-speaking provinces of Canada and the United States.

In some communities in India, spouses and children take the father's first name or proper name.

Often there are interesting variations of name adoption, including family name adoption. In Massachusetts, for instance, a Harvard study in 2004 found that about 87% of college-educated women take their husbands' name on marriage, down from a peak before 1975 of over 90%, but up from about 80% in 1990. The same study found women with a college degree were "two to four times (depending on age) more likely to retain their surname" than those without a college degree.

In the lowlands of Scotland in the 16th century, married women did not change their surnames, but today it is common practice to do so.

Usually, the children of these marriages are given their father's surname. Some families (mainly in the USA) have a custom of using the mother's maiden name as a middle name for one of the children—Franklin Delano Roosevelt received his middle name in this way or even as a first name. An example from Britain is Isambard Kingdom Brunel. Spessard Holland, a former Governor of Florida and former Senator, whose mother's maiden name was Virginia Spessard, received his first name in this way.

Retain the birth name
Women who keep their own surname after marriage may do so for a number of reasons:
 They see no reason to change their name, much like men often see no reason to change theirs.
 Objection to the one-sidedness of this tradition.
 Being the last member of their family with that surname.
 To avoid the hassle of paperwork related to their change of name.
 Wishing to retain their identity.
 Preferring their last name to their spouse's last name.
 To avoid professional ramifications.

The American suffragist and abolitionist Lucy Stone (1818–1893) made a national issue of a married woman's right to keep her own surname (as she herself did upon marriage) as part of her efforts for women's rights in the U.S. Women who choose to keep their prior names have been called "Lucy Stoners". In 1879, when Boston women were granted the franchise in school elections, Stone registered to vote. But officials would not allow her to vote unless she added "Blackwell", her husband's last name, to her signature. This she refused to do, and so she was not able to vote. She did not challenge the action in a court of law.

The Lucy Stone League, named after her, was founded in 1921 by Ruth Hale; it was the first group to fight for women to be allowed to keep their maiden name after marriage—and to use it legally. Ruth Hale challenged in federal court that any government edict that would not recognize a married woman (such as herself) by the name she chose to use. In May 1921 Hale obtained a real estate deed issued in her birth name rather than her married name, Mrs. Heywood Broun.

In 1925 Doris Fleischman became the first married woman in the United States to receive a passport in her own name. But by the early 1930s the Lucy Stone League was inactive.

In People ex rel. Rago v. Lipsky, 63 N.E.2d 642 (Ill. 1945), the Appellate Court of Illinois, First District did not allow a married woman to stay registered to vote under her birth name, due to "the long-established custom, policy and rule of the common law among English-speaking peoples whereby a woman's name is changed by marriage and her husband's surname becomes as a matter of law her surname."

In 1950, Jane Grant and 22 former members restarted the Lucy Stone League; its first meeting was on 22 March 1950 in New York City. Grant promptly won the Census Bureau's agreement that a married woman could use her birth surname as her official or real name in the census. (The New York Times, 10 April 1950).

In the 1950s and 1960s, the League widened its focus to include all discrimination against women in the USA; the League was a forerunner of the National Organization for Women.

In State ex rel. Krupa v. Green, 177 N.E.2d 616 (Ohio 1961), the Ohio appellate court allowed a married woman to register to vote in her birth name which she had openly and solely used, and been well known to use, before her marriage, and held that she could use that name as a candidate for public office.

In 1972 in Stuart v. Board of Elections, 266 Md. 440, 446, on the question of whether a wife could register to vote in her birth name rather than her husband's last name, the Maryland Court of Appeals held, "[A] married woman's surname does not become that of her husband where, as here, she evidences a clear intent to consistently and nonfraudulently use her birth given name subsequent to her marriage."

In the 1970s the Olympia Brown League was founded to help women's name rights in Milwaukee, in response to a court decision against women seeking to keep their maiden names upon marriage; Olympia Brown had kept hers upon her marriage in 1873. Specifically, the case with that court decision was Kruzel v. Podell (1975), in which the Supreme Court of Wisconsin decided that a woman upon marriage adopts the last name of her husband by customarily using that name after marriage, but also stated that no law required her to.

In 1975 in Dunn v. Palermo, the Supreme Court of Tennessee held that "in this jurisdiction a woman, upon marriage, has a freedom of choice. She may elect to retain her own surname or she may adopt the surname of her husband. The choice is hers. We hold that a person's legal name is that given at birth, or as voluntarily changed by either spouse at the time of marriage, or as changed by affirmative acts as provided under the Constitution and laws of the State of Tennessee. So long as a person's name remains constant and consistent, and unless and until changed in the prescribed manner, and absent any fraudulent or legally impermissible intent, the State has no legitimate concern."

A new version of the Lucy Stone League was started in 1997, again focused on name equality.

Currently, American women do not have to change their names by law.

Join both names (hyphenation)

It is less common for women, especially in the U.S. and Canada, to add their spouse's name and their own birth name. There are examples of this, however, in U.S. senator Cindy Hyde-Smith and U.S. sitting congresswomen Sheila Cherfilus-McCormick and Mariannette Miller-Meeks, as well U.S. former congresswomen Lucille Roybal-Allard, Ileana Ros-Lehtinen, and Debbie Mucarsel-Powell. Former U.S. president Barack Obama's only maternal half-sibling is Maya Soetoro-Ng, formerly Maya Soetoro. Farrah Fawcett was known as Farrah Fawcett-Majors during her marriage to Lee Majors until their separation in 1979. Shirley Phelps-Roper was formerly known as Shirley Phelps prior to her marriage. Activist Ruby Doris Smith-Robinson was known as Ruby Doris Smith prior to her marriage.

Name blending
Although less common than name joining, a growing trend is the blending of two surnames upon marriage. This means adding parts of the two names. An example is Dawn O'Porter.

Birth name as middle name
Examples include Amy Coney Barrett, Maryanne Trump Barry, Vera Cahalan Bushfield, Marguerite Stitt Church, Hillary Rodham Clinton (dropped maiden name in 2007),Ruth Bader Ginsburg, Katherine Gudger Langley, Ruth Hanna McCormick, Nelle Wilson Reagan, Edith Nourse Rogers, Sarah Huckabee Sanders, Debbie Wasserman Schultz, Margaret Chase Smith, and Jada Pinkett Smith. During their respective marriages, Kim Kardashian and Robin Wright were known as Kim Kardashian West (from Kanye West) and Robin Wright Penn (from Sean Penn). Politician Nikki Haley is sometimes referred to as Nikki R. Haley; the "R" stands for Randhawa, her birth surname.

Husband name as middle name
Example is Marie Gluesenkamp Perez.

Wife name as middle name
Examples are Brooklyn Peltz Beckham and John Ono Lennon.

Children
In the United States, some states or areas have laws that restrict what surname a child may have. For example, Tennessee allows a child to be given a surname that does not include that of the father only upon "the concurrent submission of a sworn application to that effect signed by both parents."

Legal status of male name changes at marriage
In 2007, Michael Buday and Diana Bijon enlisted the American Civil Liberties Union and filed a discrimination lawsuit against the state of California. According to the ACLU, the obstacles facing a husband who wishes to adopt his wife's last name violated the equal protection clause provided by the 14th Amendment of the Constitution. At the time of the lawsuit, only the states of Georgia, Hawaii, Iowa, Massachusetts, New York and North Dakota explicitly allowed a man to change his name through marriage with the same ease as a woman. As a result of the lawsuit, the Name Equality Act of 2007 was passed to allow either spouse to change their name, using their marriage license as the means of the change; the law took effect in 2009.

Feminism and preserving one's personal name

 
The feminist Lucy Stone (1818–1893) made a national issue of a married woman's right to keep her own surname (as she herself did upon marriage) as part of her efforts for women's rights in the U.S. Because of her, women who choose not to use their husbands' surnames have been called "Lucy Stoners".

The feminist Elizabeth Cady Stanton took her husband's surname as part of her own, signing herself Elizabeth Cady Stanton or E. Cady Stanton, but she refused to be addressed as Mrs. Henry B. Stanton. She wrote in 1847 that "the custom of calling women Mrs. John This and Mrs. Tom That and colored men Sambo and Zip Coon, is founded on the principle that white men are lords of all." Later, when addressing the judiciary committee of the state legislature of New York in 1860 in a speech called "A Slave's Appeal", she stated in part, "The negro [slave] has no name. He is Cuffy Douglas or Cuffy Brooks, just whose Cuffy he may chance to be. The woman has no name. She is Mrs. Richard Roe or Mrs. John Doe, just whose Mrs. she may chance to be." 
 
The feminist Jane Grant, co-founder of The New Yorker, wrote in 1943 of her efforts to keep her name despite her marriage, as well as other women's experiences with their maiden names regarding military service, passports, voting, and business.

More recently, the feminist Jill Filipovic's opposition to name change for women who marry was published in The Guardian in 2013 as "Why should married women change their names? Let men change theirs", and cited as recommended reading on the theory of social construction of gender in Critical Encounters in Secondary English: Teaching Literacy Theory to Adolescents by Deborah Appleman (2014). When Filipovic married in 2018, she kept her last name.

Use as security question
One's mother's maiden name has been a common security question in banking since at least the 1980s.

Canada

In most of Canada, either partner may informally assume the spouse's surname after marriage, so long as it is not for the purposes of fraud. The same is true for people in common-law relationships, in some provinces. This is not considered a legal name change in most provinces, excluding British Columbia. For federal purposes, such as a Canadian passport, Canadians may also assume their partner's surname if they are in a common-law relationship. In the province of British Columbia, people have to undergo a legal name change if they want to use a combined surname after marriage. Their marriage certificate is considered proof of their new name.

The custom in Québec was similar to the one in France until 1981. Women would traditionally go by their husband's surname in daily life, but their maiden name remained their legal name. Since the passage of a 1981 provincial law intended to promote gender equality, as outlined in the Québec Charter of Rights, no change may be made to a person's name without the authorization of the registrar of civil status or the authorization of the court. Newlyweds who wish to change their names upon marriage must therefore go through the same procedure as those changing their names for other reasons. The registrar of civil status may authorize a name change if:

the name the person generally uses does not correspond to the name on their birth certificate,
the name is of foreign origin or too difficult to pronounce or write in its original form, or 
the name invites ridicule or has become infamous.

This law does not make it legal for a woman to change her name immediately upon marriage, as marriage is not listed among the reasons for a name change.

Spanish-speaking world
Spouses keep their original surnames. Following Spanish naming customs, a person's name consists of a given name (simple or composite) followed by two family names (surnames), the father's and the mother's. Any children whom a couple have together take both first-surnames, so if "José Gómez Hevia" and "María Reyes García" had a child named "Andrés", the resulting name would be "Andrés Gómez Reyes".

Law 11/1981 in Spain, enacted in 1981, declared among other things that children, on turning 18, now had a legal option to choose whether their father's or mother's surname came first. If a family did not exercise an option to change the order of the names in their surname, the law defaulted to the father's surname as the first.

Also in Spain, a 1995 reform in the law allows the parents to choose whether the father's or the mother's surname goes first, although this order must be the same for all their children. For instance, the name of the son of the couple in the example above could be "Andrés Gómez Reyes" or "Andrés Reyes Gómez".

In some Spanish-American countries it is customary for women to unofficially add the husband's first surname after her own, for social purposes such as invitation letters or event announcements. The couple above may introduce themselves as José Gómez Hevia and María Reyes de Gómez. It is also common to name, in formal settings, the wife of a man as "señora de ", followed by her husband's first surname.

Portuguese-speaking world
Wives usually assume the family name of their spouse, although there is a recent trend of women keeping their maiden names. Following Portuguese naming customs, a person's name consists of a given name (simple or composite) followed by two family names (surnames), the mother's and the father's. Any children whom a couple have together, take both second-surnames.

Other European countries

Austria
In Austria, since 1 April 2013, marriage does not automatically change a woman's name; therefore a name change can only take place upon legal application. Before that date, the default was for a married woman's name to be changed to that of her husband, unless she legally applied to opt out of this.

France
In France, by executive decision since 2011 and by law since 2013, any married person may officially use their spouse's name as a common name by substituting or compounding it to their own. Before this it was common for married women to use their husband's name in everyday life but this had no legal recognition.

A common name does not replace a person's family name as written on their birth certificate.

From 4 March 2002 to 4 December 2009, children given both parents' names had to have them separated by a double dash (ex: Dupont--Clairemont). On 4 December 2009, the Conseil d'État ruled that a space can be used instead of the double dash. As a result, forms asking for the choice of family name for a child (nom de famille) do so on two lines ("1ère partie: ..... ", "2e partie: ....")

Germany
In Germany, since 1977, a woman may adopt her husband's surname or a man may adopt his wife's surname. One of them may use a name combined from both surnames. The remaining single name is the "family name" (Ehename), which will be the surname of the children. If a man and woman both decide to keep and use their birth names after the wedding (no combined name), they shall declare one of those names the "family name". A combined name is not possible as a family name, but, since 2005, it has been possible to have a double name as a family name if one already had a double name, and the partner adopts that name. Double names then must be hyphenated. All family members must use that double name.

Greece
Since 1983, when Greece adopted a new marriage law which guaranteed gender equality between the spouses, women in Greece are required to keep their birth names for their whole lives.

Italy
Spouses keep their original surnames. According to the Italian Civil Code (article 143 bis), a woman who marries keeps her surname and has the option of adding her husband's surname after hers. Non-Italian citizens getting married in Italy will not have their surname changed in Italy. However, brides or grooms can request their surname change in their home country.

Netherlands
In the Netherlands, persons who have been married in the Netherlands or entered into a registered partnership will remain registered under their birth name. They are, however, permitted to use their partner's last name for social purposes or join both names. Upon marriage or registered partnership, one may also indicate how one would like to be addressed by registering one's choice at the Municipal Basis Administration (Gemeentelijke Basis Administratie) (although the birth name does not change). One may choose to be called by one's own name, one's partner's name, one's own name followed by one's partner's name (hyphenated), or one's partner's name followed by their own name (hyphenated; this was the prevailing convention up to very recently. In this case the maiden name following the hyphen only uses a capital if it is a noun; if it is an affix like van or de the affix remains uncapitalized; this is an exception to the general rule for surnames that are capitalized when standing alone). Both men and women may make this choice upon registering to get married or entering into a registered partnership. If the marriage or registered partnership ends, one may continue to use the ex-partner's last surname unless the ex-partner disagrees and requests the court to forbid the use of the ex-partner's surname.

Before the birth or adoption of a first child, married parents may choose the child's surname (mother's or father's but not both). If no choice is made, the child automatically bears the father's surname. Any further children will also go by this name. If the parents are not married, the children will automatically have their mother's name unless otherwise indicated.

Russia
There is a widespread, though not universal, custom for a newly married wife to adopt the husband's family name. However, as Russia is not a common law country, any name change requires a formal procedure including an official application to the civil acts registrar. As the same registrar also records marriages, for the convenience sake it is often done during the marriage proceedings, as governed by the Federal Law #143-FZ "On Civil State Acts", and the couple's marriage certificate has an option of having one common family name, or both spouses going by their original surname. However, the law is entirely gender neutral, and the couple may adopt either of their surnames (a husband adopting his wife's family name is an uncommon but by no means unheard-of practice, which is generally accepted and carries little to no social stigma), or even a completely different one. The law also recognizes the couple's right to use the combined family name, and for the either of the spouses to reclaim their original surname in the case the marriage is dissolved.

Asian countries

China
Traditionally, unlike in anglophone Western countries, a married woman keeps her name unchanged, without adopting her husband's surname. In mainland China a child inherits their father's surname as a norm, though the marriage law explicitly states that a child may use either parent's surname. It is also common for two children born to the same parents to take different surnames, one after the father and the other after the mother. It is also possible, though far less common, for a child to combine both parents' surnames. Amongst the Chinese diaspora overseas, especially in Southeast Asia, women rarely legally adopt their spouse's surname.

Hong Kong
Due to British influence, some people in Hong Kong have also adopted the tradition of women changing their English last name, or prepending their husband's Chinese surname to their own in official occasions or business cards but rarely on resident identification or travel documents. An example is chief executive Carrie Lam Cheng Yuet-ngor, who prepended her husband Lam Siu-por's surname to hers.

Iran
It became mandatory in 1918 to use surnames in Iran, and only in this time, the heads of families had the right to choose their family members' (including the wife) surname. It is stated in the article four of the law on Civil Registration in 1925, that "Everybody should choose his/her own name. The wife... maintains her family name that was called by." The same thing has been restated in the article three of the law on Civil Registration in 1928. There is not much difference in the article 38 of the law on Civil Registration in 1940, but there is another article (43) that says "If the couple separate legally, maintaining husband's surname is allowed if the husband allows, and if the husband has taken wife's family name, maintaining wife's surname is allowed if the wife allows." In the last related article (the article 42 of the law on Civil Registration in 1976) the same thing is said about wife's surname change, but it is silent about husband's surname change.
Currently, it is very unusual that either spouse change his/her surname after marriage in Iran.

Japan
Japanese law does not recognize married couples who have different surnames as lawful husband and wife, which means that 96% of married Japanese women take their husband's surname. In 2015, the Japanese Supreme Court upheld the name-change law, ruling that it was not unconstitutional, noting that women could informally use their maiden names, and stating that it was the parliamentarians who should decide on whether to pass new legislation on separate spousal names.

Korea (North and South Korea)
Traditionally, Korean women keep their family names after their marriage, while their children usually take the father's surname. Korea used to be relatively gender equal as of inheritance and familial duties up until at least the late 17th century. Often, family genealogy books would keep track of the daughters and their spouses and offspring too. As such, it was the norm for women to keep their maiden name and they were considered to be part of the family even after marriage. Before modern times, people were very conscious of familial values and their own family identities. It is therefore traditional for Korean women keep their surnames after marriage, based on traditional reasoning that it is what they inherited from their parents and ancestors. Colloquially, Koreans consider the name of an individual as a singular entity, and changing the family name syllable would make the name sound strange with the other syllables of the given name. 
Nowadays, women still keep their names after marriage. Children can have either parent's surname, but it is customary to use the father's surname.

Philippines

The Civil Code provides several options for married women on what surname to take upon marriage:
 keep her middle name (maternal surname) and add her husband's surname to the maiden name (e.g. Maria Isabella Flores Garcia-Dimaculangan/Ma. Isabella F. Garcia-Dimaculangan);
 take the husband's surname and make her maiden name the middle name (Maria Isabella Garcia Dimaculangan/Ma. Isabella G. Dimaculangan);
 take the husband's full name, with a prefix to indicate that she is his wife (e.g. Mrs./Ms. Dimaculangan)

In December 2021, the House of Representatives granted a bill for a woman to keep her maiden name, as Philippine law does not require a woman to take her husband's surname at marriage. This is commonly done for professional reasons, as a woman may want to retain her name among her business contacts or audience.

The Civil Code also states that children as the result of the marriage will take the mother's middle name (maiden surname) and the father's surname. To illustrate this, the children of a married couple named Maria Josefa Lopez Mañego-Luansing and Juan Candido Luansing will take the middle name Mañego and the surname Luansing, so, one daughter with a given name of Juliana will be named Juliana Mañego Luansing.

Married women in professional circles (e.g. Gloria Macapagal Arroyo, Korina Sanchez-Roxas, Vilma Santos-Recto) typically join their maiden and married surnames in both professional and legal use (e.g. Maria Isabella Flores Garcia-Dimaculangan/Ma. Isabella F. Garcia-Dimaculangan). This allows them to be identified as married, and keep track of their professional achievements without being confused for being two different individual (e.g. Maria Isabella Flores Garcia/Ma. Isabella F. Garcia, as against Maria Isabella Garcia Dimaculangan/Ma. Isabella G. Dimaculangan)

An older scheme based on Spanish naming customs add the particle de ("of") between the maiden and married surnames (e.g. Maria Isabella Garcia de Dimaculangan or Ma. Isabella G. de Dimaculangan). This tradition is no longer common.

Taiwan
Taiwanese women generally keep their surnames after marriage, while their children may inherit either the father's or the mother's. It is, however, legal to take the spouse's surname. Some older women have the husband's surname tagged on to theirs, as was common in the early to mid-20th century.

Thailand
A Thai wife who adopted her husband's surname due to the old law requiring it, can also change back to her original surname.

Turkey
Since 2014, women in Turkey are allowed to keep their birth names alone for their whole life instead of using their husbands' names. Previously, the Turkish Code of Civil Law, Article 187, required a married woman to use her husband's surname; or else to use her birth name in front of her husband's name by giving a written application to the marriage officer or the civil registry office. In 2014, the Constitutional Court ruled that prohibiting married women from retaining only maiden names is a violation of their rights.

Vietnam
In Vietnamese culture, women keep their family names once they marry, whilst the progeny tend to keep the father's family name, although names can often be combined from father's and mother's family name e.g. Nguyễn Lê, Phạm Vũ, Kim Lý etc.

Genealogy
Genealogists often also make note of all surnames used by a person during their lifetime (such as those acquired from birth parents, those assigned at birth when the father is unknown or not acknowledged, those acquired at marriage, and those acquired at a remarriage). For example, an illegitimate male child abandoned at birth in Italy or in other European countries will receive no surname from either of his birth parents but, instead, will be assigned a surname—often invented from one of the three kingdoms of nature, e.g., mineral ("Pietra"), vegetable ("Rosa") or animal ("Leoni"), or otherwise according to custom within a locality, such as "Esposito" (meaning "abandoned") or "Casa Grande" (referring to the "Domo Magna," e.g., the ospizio [hospital] where abandoned).

See also

Double-barrelled name
Galton–Watson process
Given name
Lucy Stone League
Matriname
Matronymic
Name change
Patrilineality
Patronymic
Spanish naming customs
Surname

References

External links
Why should women change their names on getting married? – a history of name changing upon marriage in the UK and in the US

Surname
Names

pt:Nome de batismo